"Crzy" (stylized as "CRZY") is a song by American singer and songwriter Kehlani. It was released on July 15, 2016 and serves as the lead single from their debut album, SweetSexySavage. The song was produced by female R&B and pop duo Novawav.

Background
"CRZY" was written by Kehlani and produced by Novawav, a Grammy Award-winning songwriting and production team consisting of Denisia "Blu June" Andrews and Brittany "Chi" Coney. They said the song was made in an effort to "create an unapologetic statement embracing the challenges and double standards that come with being a woman".

The song sees Kehlani take on an assertive and boastful tone over a trap-influenced R&B beat as they tell the listener not to discredit their passion, talent and achievements.

Music video
The song's accompanying music video premiered on September 21, 2016 on Kehlani's YouTube account. The music video was directed by Benny Boom.

Remix
The official remix of the song, featuring American rapper A Boogie wit da Hoodie, was released on November 17, 2016.

Charts

Certifications

References

2016 singles
2016 songs
Kehlani songs
Atlantic Records singles
Songs written by Kehlani